Sunburn  is the third album by Dayton, Ohio funk band Sun.

Track listing
Introduction: You Are My Sunshine 	0:15 	
Sun Is Here 	5:02 	
Dance (Do What You Wanna Do) 	6:05 	
When You Put Your Hand In Mine 	5:54 	
You're The One 	4:18 	
Long Drawn Out Thang 	6:16 	
You Don't Have To Hurry 	5:11 	
I Had A Choice 	4:37 	
Sun Of A Gun 	4:54

Personnel
Byron Byrd - Lead and Backing Vocals, Bass, Piano, Keyboards, Percussion, Flute, Trombone, Alto, Baritone and Soporano Saxophone
Kym Yancey - Drums, Percussion, Backing Vocals
Sonnie Talbert - Organ, Clavinet, Synthesizer, Keyboards, Guitar, Backing Vocals
Keith Cheatham - Lead and Backing Vocals, Lead Guitar, Trombone, Percussion
Ernie Knisley - Congas, Percussion, Trumpet, Baritone Saxophone, Backing Vocals
Curtis Hooks - Bass, Alto Saxophone, Lead and Backing Vocals
Gary King - Trombone, Backing Vocals
Robert Arnold - Trumpet, Backing Vocals
Nigel Boulton - Trumpet, Flugelhorn, Piano, Backing Vocals

Charts

Singles

External links
 Sun-Sunburn at Discogs

References

1978 albums
Sun (R&B band) albums
Capitol Records albums